The Catocalini are a tribe of moths in the family Erebidae. Adults of many species in the tribe are called underwing moths due to their vividly colored hindwings that are often covered by contrastingly dark, drab forewings.

Taxonomy
The tribe is most closely related to the tribe Audeini, also within the Erebinae.

Genera

Archaeopilocornus Kühne, 2005
Catocala
Spiloloma
Tachosa
Ulotrichopus

Former genera
 Artena
 Audea
 Crypsotidia
 Hypotacha
 Mecodina

References

 
Erebinae
Moth tribes